Copper Culture State Park is a   Wisconsin state park in Oconto, northeastern Wisconsin.  The park has natural areas, farmlands, archaeological sites, and a Native American museum.

Features

Archaeological site
The park contains an ancient burial ground used by the Old Copper Complex Culture of early Native Americans, between 5,000 and 6,000 B.C.E. during the Copper Age. It was rediscovered in June 1952 by a 13-year-old boy who unearthed human bones while playing in an old quarry. By July the first archaeological dig had commenced, as part of the program of the Wisconsin Archaeological Survey.

Artifacts
Utilitarian products were much more numerous than ornamental items in the grave goods found, and the ancient artifacts were created from various materials.
Copper: awls, crescents, clasps; and a spear-point, fishhook, bracelet, spirally-coiled tubing, rivet, and a spatula. 
Chipped stone: scraper, projectile points.
Bone: awl (fish jawbone), and a "fine specimen of a whistle" (leg bone of a swan).
Antler: possible flaking tools.
Shell: pond snail (Campeloma decisum) beads.

The ancient burial ground is a National Historic Landmark, on the National Register of Historic Places listings in Wisconsin, and protected within Copper Culture State Park.

Charles Werrebroeck Museum
The Oconto Archaic Copper Museum is located within the Charles Werrebroeck Museum—Belgium Home, a traditional Belgian style farmhouse built in 1924 by Charles Werrebroeck. Artifacts and photographs from excavations on the park's grounds are displayed in the museum.

Recreation
Other features in the 40-acre Copper Culture State Park include picnic tables, BBQ grills, restrooms, and a community pavilion.

Natural history
Nature trails explore various natural habitats in the park.
Laurentian Mixed Forest woodlands
Riparian zone of the Oconto River, and fishing in it. 
Short-grass prairie

Access
Copper Culture State Park is managed by the Oconto County Historical Society, a non-profit organization, rather than the Wisconsin Department of Natural Resources, therefore admission is free. Visitors do not require a Wisconsin state park pass to enter, but are encouraged to make a donation at the museum.

The Charles Werrebroeck Museum, with the Oconto Archaic Copper Museum, is open in the summer daily from Memorial Day to Labor Day from 10am to 4pm, or by appointment. Free admission and guided tours are available.

See also
Old Copper Complex
Native American archeological sites on the National Register of Historic Places listings in Oconto County, Wisconsin'''
Archibald Lake Mound Group — near Townsend.
Boulder Lake Site — near Doty 
White Potato Lake Garden Beds Site — near BrazeauGreat Lakes tribal culture

References

External links

official Copper Culture State Park website
Belgium-Roots Project: Belgium Home—the Werrebroeck Farmhouse — in Copper Culture State Park, Oconto County (Wisconsin)''.

State parks of Wisconsin
Great Lakes tribal culture
Native American museums in Wisconsin
Archaeological museums in Wisconsin
Museums in Oconto County, Wisconsin
Archaeological sites on the National Register of Historic Places in Wisconsin
National Historic Landmarks in Wisconsin
Protected areas established in 1959
Protected areas of Oconto County, Wisconsin
National Register of Historic Places in Oconto County, Wisconsin
1959 establishments in Wisconsin